Colhoun, a surname of Scottish origin, is a variant of the surname Colquhoun. Colhoun may refer to:

People
 Edmund Colhoun (1821–1897), admiral in the U.S. Navy
 John E. Colhoun (1750–1802), U.S. senator and lawyer from South Carolina
 John Colhoun (plant pathologist) (1913–2002), British mycologist, phytopathologist, and professor of cryptogamic botany
 Mabel Colhoun (1905–1992), Irish photographer, teacher and archaeologist
 Ossie Colhoun (born 1938), Irish cricketer

Places
 Lumsden (Colhoun) Airport, Saskatchewan, Canada
 Calhoun College, a college of Yale University

Ships
 USS Colhoun (DD-85), a U.S. Navy destroyer 1918-1942
 USS Colhoun (DD-801), a U.S. Navy destroyer 1944-1945

See also
 Calhoun (disambiguation), variant name
 Colquhoun, variant name